Mutton flaps, or breast of lamb, are an inexpensive cut of meat from a sheep.

Consisting of a sheep's lower rib meat, mutton flaps are considered a low-quality cut in Western countries, unlike to pork and beef ribs. They have been described there as a "tough, scraggy meat", if not properly prepared. Their high fat content has also contributed to their unpopularity in many Western countries, although they are widely used as döner meat in Europe.

Mutton flaps are a staple in the South Pacific where their high fat content has been linked with the development of obesity problems. In 2000, Fiji banned their import. On July 1, 2020, Tonga banned the import of mutton flaps from New Zealand, claiming their consumption plays a major role in increasing obesity among the population.

Method of cooking 
In Indonesia, a similar cut of meat called breast of goat is cooked by cutting it into pieces and grilling using skewers. This dish, called sate kronyos, is especially popular in Bantul, Yogyakarta.

References

See also 
 Lamb and mutton
 Turkey tails

 

Lamb dishes